'''
Manohar Joshi was Chief Minister of Maharashtra from 14 March 1995 – 31 January 1999. His cabinet ministers were:

Chief Minister and Cabinet ministers

Ministers of State

From Shiv Sena

From Bharatiya Janata Party
Sudhir Mungantiwar: Tourism

Ministers by Party

See also
Narayan Rane ministry

References

J
Shiv Sena
1995 in Indian politics
Bharatiya Janata Party state ministries
1995 establishments in Maharashtra
1999 disestablishments in India
Cabinets established in 1995
Cabinets disestablished in 1999